is a professional squash player who represents Japan. She reached a career-high world ranking of World No. 29 in January 2014.

References

External links 
 
 
 
 

1989 births
Living people
Japanese female squash players
People from Tokyo
Asian Games bronze medalists for Japan
Asian Games medalists in squash
Squash players at the 2010 Asian Games
Squash players at the 2014 Asian Games
Squash players at the 2018 Asian Games
Medalists at the 2018 Asian Games
Competitors at the 2013 World Games
Competitors at the 2017 World Games
20th-century Japanese women
21st-century Japanese women